Christopher Roderick Emmett (born 13 December 1938 in Nuneaton, Warwickshire) is a British actor and comedian best known for his work in the late 1970s on the BBC Radio 4 comedies The Burkiss Way and Alison and Maud. He was a regular on various series starring Roy Hudd, including The News Huddlines, The Newly Discovered Casebook of Sherlock Holmes, Huddwinks and Crowned Hudds.  He was also a regular on Week Ending and appeared in a number of sketches in the television game show 3-2-1. In August 2003, he featured in the Talking to One Person episode of BBC Radio 4 comedy Smelling of Roses, playing the old disc jockey Kenny Truman as he tried to get a job on radio station Gleam FM.

He is a member of the showbusiness charitable fraternity the Grand Order of Water Rats and is currently King Rat.

References

External links

1938 births
Living people
English male comedians
20th-century English male actors
21st-century English male actors
People from Nuneaton
Male actors from Warwickshire